The Global Lepidoptera Names Index (LepIndex) is a searchable database maintained by the Department of Entomology at the Natural History Museum, London.

It is based on card indices and scanned journals, nomenclatural catalogues and the Zoological Record. It contains most of world's Lepidoptera names published until 1981 and for some groups is up to date.

LepIndex allows anyone free internet access to:
 the zoological authority who named a butterfly or moth species 
 where the original description was published
 status of the name (valid name or synonym)

It is the main source of Lepidoptera names in the Integrated Taxonomic Information System and Catalogue of Life.

References

External links

 LepIndex home

Lepidopterology
Online databases
Zoological nomenclature
Entomological databases